Josefa Carpena-Amat (December 19, 1919 – June 5, 2005), known by the pseudonym Pepita Carpeña,  was a militant trade unionist, writer, and Spanish anarchist.

Biography
Born in Barcelona, Spain, Pepita started working at the age of twelve. At the age of 14, she became involved in the Spanish Revolution and was active with the Confederación Nacional del Trabajo (CNT). In late 1937, Carpeña joined the anarchist-feminist movement Mujeres Libres, later becoming its propaganda secretary. During this time, she worked in a weapons factory. She became a women's liberationist.

In 1939, she was obliged to leave Spain, and lived the rest of her life in Marseilles, France. From April 1992 to June 1993, Pepita wrote her memoirs called "De Toda la Vida" in Castilian. She translated this into French for another memoir called Toute une vie: memoires, which was published in 2000. She contributed to 2 collective works: Mujeres Libres and Luchadoras Libertarias, which were also translated into French. She participated in activities of the Marseilles branch of the Centre International de Recherches sur l'Anarchisme (CIRA), since 1979. She was also the coordinator of the branch from 1988 to 1999. She participated in a debate that lasted for days, about feminism and post-feminism at the International Exhibition held in Barcelona, which appeared as a book in 1994. Carpeña died on June 5, 2005 and her body was cremated.

References

1919 births
2005 deaths
Mujeres Libres
Spanish anarchists
Spanish revolutionaries
Spanish memoirists
Spanish translators
20th-century Spanish writers
21st-century Spanish writers
20th-century Spanish women writers
21st-century Spanish women writers
20th-century memoirists
20th-century translators
Spanish emigrants to France
Anarcha-feminists
Spanish feminists